Boris Said III (born September 18, 1962) is an American semi-retired professional racing driver. He last competed part-time in the NASCAR Cup Series, driving the No. 66 Ford Mustang for MBM Motorsports and in the Trans-Am Series, driving the No. 2 Dodge for Weaver Technologies Racing.

Said has competed in a variety of disciplines including sports cars, stock cars, and touring cars. He has extensive international road racing experience, having won the Rolex Sports Car Series GT championship in 2004, the 24 Hours Nürburgring, served as a factory BMW Motorsport driver, and raced in the V8 Supercars. His NASCAR career began in 1995 as a road course ringer primarily due to his success on such tracks; he won one race each in the Xfinity and Truck Series.

Racing career

Early career

Said's early interest was in motocross racing. In 1985, while attending the Detroit Grand Prix as a spectator, he met SCCA champion Bob Sharp.

He began racing with the SCCA in 1987. Said was named SCCA rookie of the year in 1988. In 1991, he began driving for Baer Racing, later to become Baer Brake Systems. Upon Baer's withdrawal from the series to focus on the manufacturing of brakes in 1992, Said got another big ride driving in the IMSA series in 1993, driving a BMW M3. He won the 1997 and 1998 24 Hours of Daytona and the 1998 12 Hours of Sebring in IMSA. He also became the first American to win the 24 Hours Nürburgring in 2005, driving a BMW Motorsport-entered BMW M3 GTR with co-drivers Pedro Lamy, Duncan Huisman and Andy Priaulx.

NASCAR career

1995–2000: Truck Series
Said made his NASCAR debut in 1995 in the Craftsman Truck Series at Sears Point International Raceway, driving the No. 4 Ford F-150 for Irvan-Simo Racing. He started 25th and finished 24th out of a 26-truck field due to overheating problems. He made three starts the following year driving Irvan's No. 28 1-800-Collect Ford. His best finish was thirteenth, at I-70 Speedway.

Said moved to trucks full time in 1997, in the No. 44 Federated Auto Parts Ford. While his rookie season did not yield any wins, he finished second at the Pronto Auto Parts 400K and finished 16th in the final standings. Said received notice from fans and drivers when he contacted championship contender Rich Bickle at the 1997 October Sonoma truck race. Bickle had blamed Said for causing him to lose a top-five running and made contact that cut down Said's tire. In reply, an angry Said waited for Bickle to come back around and retaliated. Both drivers apologized the next day. Said was fined $15,000 and was suspended until he paid the fine.

The following year, he won his first career Truck Series race, at Sears Point, in addition to his first truck pole, at Heartland Park Topeka. He also made his Busch Series debut, at Watkins Glen International Raceway, starting on the pole but finishing 40th in the No. 12 Zippo Chevy owned by Jimmy Spencer.

In 1999, Said scaled back on his Truck Series schedule, running only six events. He won poles at Portland and Topeka for Irvan-Simo, as well as driving for Team Racing and Bobby Rahal. He made his Winston Cup debut, at Watkins Glen, qualifying on the outside pole and leading nine laps before his No. 14 Ford suffered engine problems. He also drove at Homestead-Miami Speedway, finishing 34th.

In 2000, he made what would be his final truck series start for five years, at Portland, finishing 15th. After a 30th-place run at California Speedway, he returned to the Cup Series, driving the No. 23 for Jimmy Spencer, and finished 42nd at Sears Point. He also attempted the Cup race at Watkins Glen but failed to qualify due to a lack of owner's points.

2001–2005
He saw limited action in 2001, as a warrant for his arrest was issued relating to a civil lawsuit dating back to 1989. He would go on to finish fourth in a Busch Series race at Watkins Glen in a Robbie Reiser-owned car and drove a pair of races for Jasper Motorsports. He competed for the win in the 2001 Cup Series race at the Glen. While running third on the final restart, Said tried to make a pass by Jeff Burton to try to take the lead from the dominant car of Jeff Gordon but got held up in traffic, causing him to slip back to 8th place, scoring his first top ten of his Cup series career.

After running with Jasper again in 2002, Said served as a fill-in driver for Jerry Nadeau at MB2/MBV Motorsports. He won the pole for the Sears Point race in California. He stayed in the top ten all race. With pit strategies, it seemed like the win would come down to Said and fellow road ace Ron Fellows. However, Said and Fellows forgot to pit when they were told to before a caution came out. Because they did not pit before the caution with 38 laps to go, Said and Fellows lost their shot at the win. Said restarted 26th and recovered for sixth place. At Watkins Glen, Said would have a very fast #01 Pontiac driving through the field towards the front, only to be taken out by Robby Gordon who would go on to win the race. In a post-race interview, and in the years afterwards, Boris would claim that the 2003 Watkins Glen race was the biggest disappointment of his racing career, as it was the best car he had ever driven.

Said signed on to drive a limited schedule for the team in 2004, running the No. 36 Centrix Financial Chevrolet, and finished sixth once again at Sears Point. The team expanded to run more races for 2005, where his best finish in nine starts was a third at Watkins Glen. During that season, he returned to the truck series, finishing 35th at Kentucky Speedway while filling for an injured Rick Crawford. He also ran two races in the Busch Series for Phoenix Racing and had a fifth-place finish at Autodromo Hermanos Rodriguez in Mexico City. At year's end, Said and the MB2 team parted ways after Centrix Financial went bankrupt.

2006–2008

Said joined Evernham Motorsports to help the team's road-course program in 2006. He won the pole at Mexico City and finished second, as well as driving the No. 4 Geico Dodge Charger for Biagi-DenBeste Racing at Lowe's Motor Speedway, starting 40th and finishing 31st. In May 2006, Said and crew chief Frank Stoddard and Mark Simo announced the creation of No Fear Racing, which used equipment from Roush Fenway Racing. They ran four Cup races starting with the Dodge/Save Mart 350 at Infineon Raceway. He won the pole at the Pepsi 400, his first Nextel Cup pole on an oval, in one of the biggest upsets in Daytona history. Following his pole win, he promised a pit reporter that if he either won the race, the race at Watkins Glen International or an NNS race within three years, that he would shave his head, come to the channel the next week and show everybody. He was leading the race with three laps to go and was passed by his friend Tony Stewart; after two more laps, he finished fourth—his highest career NASCAR finish on an oval track. In a post-race interview, Said emotionally said his performance in the Pepsi 400 was "the highlight of my career."

At Watkins Glen, Said had originally finished sixth, but hours after the race was over he was to 31st place by officials due to a scoring error. Years later, it was revealed that Said and fellow road-course ringer Ron Fellows had each been given a 30-second penalty for having made illegal passes through the inner-loop on the final lap.

Said qualified and ran in the 2007 Daytona 500. Although he was not in the top 35 teams from the 2006 owner's points, Said posted the fastest qualifying time among non-locked teams and the sixth-fastest qualifying time overall. Starting in 23rd position, Said dropped back to last place near the beginning of the race and had no hope of regaining enough speed to finish well. However, he got a good finish when he managed to avoid a massive crash at the finish and cross the line in 14th place, behind winner Kevin Harvick. Said finished ninth at Sonoma but failed to qualify at Daytona and Watkins Glen due to rain.

Said failed to qualify for the 2008 Daytona 500 but had a productive NNS season. Following an incident with Marcos Ambrose at Mexico City that wrecked his car, Said angrily wagged his finger at Ambrose when he passed by to lap him down. Said initially vowed payback against Ambrose, but he ultimately moved forward. Said came back and finished 5th in Montreal that year. The following week, Said drove one race at Watkins Glen for Jimmy Means in partnership between Means and No Fear - he finished one lap down in 27th place.

2009–2010
No Fear Racing merged with the No. 08 E&M Motorsports car in 2009 to become Carter-Simo Racing, and Said qualified for the races at Infineon and Watkins Glen in the No. 08. He also attempted the Daytona 500 in the same car, but failed to qualify for the race for the second straight year.

Said drove the No. 26 for Latitude 43 Motorsports in 2010. He also announced a one-year deal to drive the No. 09 Zaxby's NNS Ford for RAB Racing in the Nationwide series road-course events. He ran the first four races and Infineon. His crew chief, Frank Stoddard, was livid with Tony Stewart for contact on the final lap of the Infineon race and confronted him in the garage, but Said did not take part in it and apologized for his team's behavior the next day. The cars used were former Roush Fenway Racing Fords, and the team, which finished 22nd in 2009 and was sold to satisfy NASCAR's four-cars-per-team rule, had exemptions for the first five races of 2010. By August 2010, Said stated that he did not expect to be back with Latitude 43. Said received a one-race deal from Red Bull Racing at Watkins Glen to replace an ill Brian Vickers. He was having a good run, but in the ending laps, he made contact with Stewart that took him out of contention to win.

Meanwhile, Said had a successful NNS season. On August 29, 2010, Said led the rest of the race after Robby Gordon ran out of gas with three laps to go and won his long-desired first NASCAR Nationwide Series race at the Circuit Gilles Villeneuve in Montreal. His close friend, who he had raced with in F1 and NNS before, Italian driver Max Papis, passed him in the final turn to try to win, but a mistake by jumping over the curb too high cost him the win. Said passed Papis after the mistake, and they raced to the finish. By the time they reached the line, Said was a bumper ahead of Papis (The finish resembled the 2009 Montreal finish, where Australian driver Marcos Ambrose dominated but made the same mistake Papis made, handing the win to Carl Edwards). Said publicly shaved his curly hair and received applause when he received TV attention for his victory.

2011: Phoenix Racing and Watkins Glen incident
Said drove for Phoenix Racing in the Sprint Cup Series road-course events in 2011. During the 2011 Heluva Good! Sour Cream Dips at the Glen, Boris was involved in a heated incident with Greg Biffle. On the final lap of the race, Said was involved in a collision with Biffle's teammate David Ragan which ended with David Reutimann flipping over into the guardrails. Post-race, Said and Biffle had a garage confrontation in which Biffle reportedly took a swing at Said and then gestured profanely at him. Boris tried to attack Biffle physically, only to be held back by crew members from Paul Menard's team, FAS Lane Racing, and Biffle's team.

After the race, Said apologized for wrecking Ragan but angrily retorted: I'm more upset with Greg Biffle, he is the most unprofessional little scaredy cat I've ever seen in my life, he won't even fight me like a man. So if someone texts me his address, I’ll go see him Wednesday at his house and show him what he really needs. He needs a friggin’ whooping, and I’m going to give it to him. He was flipping me off, giving the finger, totally unprofessional. Two laps down, I mean, he's a chump ... I went over there to go talk to him, and he wouldn't even let me get out of the car, and he comes over and throws a few little baby punches, and when I get out, he runs away and hides behind some big guys. But he won't hide from me long, I'll find him. I won't settle it out on the track - it's not right to wreck cars - but he'll show up at a race with a black eye one of these days. I'll see him somewhere. The incident was investigated by NASCAR officials, but no penalties were given, with Biffle and Said later settling their dispute with a phone call. Said received a late call up from Turner Scott Motorsports to run the 2011 NAPA Auto Parts 200 Nationwide Series race in Montreal in the No. 30 Great Clips Chevrolet.

2012–2014: FAS Lane Racing

Said reunited with Frank Stoddard in 2012 to run the Sprint Cup Series road course races for Stoddard's race team that he formed in 2011, FAS Lane Racing. He returned for the same two races in 2013, and in 2014, now renamed Go FAS Racing after the team merged with Nationwide Series team Go Green Racing.

2015–2017: 2 planned retirements, Go FAS Racing, Joe Gibbs Racing, and Circle Sport-TMG
For 2015, he returned to the No. 32 for the fourth straight year to run Sonoma and Watkins Glen. At Sonoma, he finished 26th. In early March 2015, Said was picked to drive the No. 54 Monster Energy car in the Xfinity Series for Joe Gibbs Racing, substituting for an injured Kyle Busch. Said raced at Talladega, both Iowa races, Chicagoland, Mid-Ohio, Road America and Kentucky in the 2015 season. At Talladega during the Aaron's 312, Said ran as high as second, but as the race got competitive during the final 25 laps, he finished 16th. At Iowa, Said brought home a top-24 finish. Because Busch returned earlier than expected, Said was not needed for the Chicagoland races and the next Iowa race. However, Said was called on to replace Busch during the three road-course events including the Zippo 200, as Busch withdrew from that race to continue his healing process of his leg. His best finish in the No. 54 was a fourth at Watkins Glen during the 2015 Zippo 200. In the last of his starts in the JGR No. 54 at Road America, Said announced that it could likely be his final NASCAR start. This had appeared to be the case as Said did not enter the 2016 Toyota/Save Mart 350 (Patrick Carpentier was instead in the No. 32), which was the first time since 1998 that he was not entered in the Cup Series race at Sonoma, and the first time since 1999 that he was not in the race itself. However, Said did end up returning to the No. 32 at Watkins Glen, and he would finish 24th.

With Go FAS Racing hiring one full season driver, Matt DiBenedetto, for the first time in 2017, Said was left out of the No. 32. On June 20, 2017, Said announced that he would drive the No. 33 Chevrolet SS for Circle Sport – The Motorsports Group for Sonoma, replacing Jeffrey Earnhardt. This was the first Cup Series team that Said drove for in the last 5 years other than GFR. He ran as high as 12th at Sonoma and finished 29th. Later that season, Said announced during the week of the Watkins Glen race that the 2017 I Love New York 355 at The Glen would be his final NASCAR race. He finished 30th in that race.

2021–2022: Return to NASCAR 
On May 17, 2021, it was revealed through the release of the entry list for the Xfinity Series race at Circuit of the Americas that Said would drive the No. 13 for MBM Motorsports. It is his first NASCAR start since 2017 and his first Xfinity Series start since 2015. Said also attempted to qualify for the Xfinity Series race at Road America, but would fail to qualify.

On March 11, 2022, MBM Motorsports announced on their Facebook page that Said would be entering the Texas Grand Prix in the No. 66 Ford Mustang, in his first Cup Series start since 2017. Said started the race 37th, the slowest time set during qualifying. He finished the race 26th.

American Le Mans Series
Said competed for the PTG Racing Group in the 2000 season, driving a BMW M3 in the GT category, and managed to win at Laguna Seca.

The PTG Team finished third overall in the GT category that year.

Said was listed as a driver on the 2011 24 Hours of Le Mans LM GTE Am class entry of Robertson Racing.

V8 Supercars
Said was entered into round nine of the Australian V8 Supercar series, the L&H 500 at Phillip Island, Victoria, that took place on the weekend of 12–14 September 2008. He drove the No. 67 Supercheap Auto with Matt Neal. They finished the race in 19th.

This deal also included racing at the 2008 Supercheap Auto Bathurst 1000 at Mount Panorama Circuit near Bathurst, New South Wales. This took place from the 9th to the 12th of October 2008 and was by far the largest event on the Australian touring car calendar. Said failed to finish the race after his teammate Matt Neal crashed the car.

He returned to the category to drive alongside Steve Owen in the 2011 Armor All Gold Coast 600 with Paul Morris Motorsport, finishing in 18th on Saturday and seventh on Sunday.

X Games

Said has competed in the X Games twice. He was invited as an "at-large" rally car entry for the X Games XIII at the Home Depot Center in Los Angeles, on August 5, 2007. Said was joined by American rally car racing legend John Buffum as his co-driver.

Said returned to the X Games at Austin in 2015, competing in the Stadium Super Trucks category. He finished fourth of five trucks in his heat race and was forced to contest the last-chance qualifier; he finished fourth in the LCQ and missed the final.

Trans-Am Series

While attempting his career in the NASCAR Winston Cup Series in the early-2000's, Said had a tremendous career in Trans-Am Series racing. He has won over 40 races in SCCA racing, including in Trans-Am and IMSA. Said also captured the 2002 Trans-Am Series championship during a season where he won all but four races. In 2003, Said's career in Trans-Am came to a halt when he found himself at odds with series officials, sitting out a 45-day suspension for alleged "unprofessional conduct". Said would not be active in Trans-Am competition until 2019 when he returned to the series.

In 2021, Said competed in the Trans-Am Series Pirelli Atlanta SpeedTour at Road Atlanta, which he would win, as well as the SpeedFest at Laguna Seca, both in the No. 2 Dodge for Weaver Technologies Racing.

Personal life
His father, Bob Said, drove in a Formula One race in 1959 and was a United States Olympic bobsled driver in 1968 and 1972.

Said was a co-founder of apparel and action-sports company No Fear, which sponsored much of his racing career. He also established Honda and Suzuki motorcycle dealerships when he was 21 years old.

Said's son, Boris Jr, is also a racing driver and competed in dirt bikes and go-karts before making his debut in the Trans-Am Series in the race at Road Atlanta in 2020.

Motorsports career results

SCCA national championship runoffs

Complete 24 Hours of Le Mans results

NASCAR
(key) (Bold – Pole position awarded by qualifying time. Italics – Pole position earned by points standings or practice time. * – Most laps led.)

Cup Series

Daytona 500

Xfinity Series

Craftsman Truck Series

 Ineligible for series points

Busch North Series

K&N Pro Series West

ARCA Re/Max Series
(key) (Bold – Pole position awarded by qualifying time. Italics – Pole position earned by points standings or practice time. * – Most laps led.)

Supercars results
(key) (Races in bold indicate pole position) (Races in italics indicate fastest lap)

 Ineligible for championship points

WeatherTech SportsCar Championship results
(key)(Races in bold indicate pole position, Results are overall/class)

1 – Relegated to last in class for violation of minimum drive time requirements.

References

External links
 

Living people
1962 births
Racing drivers from New York City
24 Hours of Le Mans drivers
24 Hours of Daytona drivers
NASCAR drivers
Trans-Am Series drivers
Supercars Championship drivers
American Le Mans Series drivers
Rolex Sports Car Series drivers
NASCAR team owners
Sportspeople from Carlsbad, California
Racing drivers from California
Sportspeople from Stamford, Connecticut
WeatherTech SportsCar Championship drivers
Stadium Super Trucks drivers
X Games athletes
American people of Syrian descent
SCCA National Championship Runoffs winners
ADAC GT Masters drivers
ARCA Menards Series drivers
Evernham Motorsports drivers
Joe Gibbs Racing drivers
Schnitzer Motorsport drivers
BMW M drivers
Nürburgring 24 Hours drivers